Dindigul C. Srinivasan (born 1 April 1948) is an Indian politician and former four term Member of Parliament of India elected from Tamil Nadu. He is currently serving as Member Of Legislative Assembly for  Dindigul Constituency since 2016. He is one of senior most  member of the party AIADMK.He served as Minister for Forests for Tamil Nadu from 2016 to 2021.

He is the treasurer of the All India Anna Dravida Munnetra Kazhagam (AIADMK) From 11 July 2022.

He was elected to the Lok Sabha from Dindigul constituency as an AIADMK candidate in the Indian general elections of 1989, 1991, 1998 and 1999 in Tamil Nadu.

Elected in Legislative Assembly Election 2016 and 2021 in Dindigulassembly Constituency for consecutive 2 terms, he belongs to Piramalai Kallar Community.

Jayalalithaa appointed Sreenivasan as Minister for Forests in May 2016. This was his first cabinet post in the Government of Tamil Nadu.

On 11 July 2022, C. Sreenivasan was made Treasurer of All India Anna Dravida Munnetra Kazhagam.

References 

Living people
1948 births
All India Anna Dravida Munnetra Kazhagam politicians
Lok Sabha members from Tamil Nadu
State cabinet ministers of Tamil Nadu
People from Madurai district
People from Dindigul district
Tamil Nadu MLAs 2021–2026
Tamil Nadu MLAs 2016–2021
Dravida Munnetra Kazhagam politicians